Cindy Orquídea Lima García known as Cindy Lima (born 21 June 1981) is a former Spanish professional basketball player representing Spain, winning four medals including gold in the 2013 EuroBasket. She played in 15 teams and 9 countries in her career. She competed in the 2008 Summer Olympics.

Club career 
Born in Barcelona to a Cuban mother and an Angolan father, Lima played in youth clubs Inmaculada Horta, [[Segle XX] and Santa Rosa de Lima. She made her debut in the  top tier of the Spanish League  in 1998 with UB-Barça. After her second season, she signed for [Portugal|Portuguese]] club CAB Madeira, where she remained for one year. She spent the following eight seasons in Spain: four at Celta de Vigo Baloncesto, two at Mann Filter and two at CB San José León.

She played in a variety of clubs from 2009 onwards: Latvia's TTT Riga, Cyprus's KV Imperial and Spain's Ros Casares Valencia just in the 2009-2010 season. She played for French team Aix en Provence in 2011-12. The following season Lima played for Turkish Tarsus Beledeyesi  and Hungarian Uni Győr. The 2013-2014 season started for Lima at CB Conquero in Spain and finished at Egyptian team  Al Gezira. Her last season as a professional player started for Lima at Czech Republic's  SBS Ostrava and finished in France, playing for Tarbes.

National team
She made her debut with Spain women's national basketball team at the age of 26. She played with the senior team for 7 years, from 2007 to 2014, getting 120 caps  and 3.4 PPG.  She participated in the (Beijing 2008) Olympic tournament, one World Championships and four European Championships:

 5th 1997 FIBA Europe Under-16 Championship for Women (youth)
  1998 FIBA Europe Under-18 Championship for Women (youth)
 5th 2000 FIBA Europe Under-20 Championship for Women (youth)
  2007 Eurobasket
 5th 2008 Summer Olympics
  2009 Eurobasket
  2010 World Championship
 5th2011 Eurobasket
  2013 Eurobasket

References

1981 births
Living people
Spanish women's basketball players
Olympic basketball players of Spain
Basketball players at the 2008 Summer Olympics
Spanish people of Angolan descent
Spanish sportspeople of African descent
Spanish people of Cuban descent
Centers (basketball)